Dmitry Ivanovich Abramovich (7 August 1873, Hulivka, Volhynian Governorate – 4 March 1955, Vilnius) was a Soviet historian and writer.

1873 births
1955 deaths
People from Volyn Oblast
People from Lutsky Uyezd
Literary theorists
Palaeographers
Soviet historians
Corresponding Members of the Russian Academy of Sciences (1917–1925)
Corresponding Members of the USSR Academy of Sciences